Mestizo Colombians refers to Colombians who are of European (mostly Spaniard) and Amerindian ancestry.

Numbers and distribution
The 2018 census reported that 87% of the population do not consider part of some the recognized ethnic groups, being mostly mestizos and Whites. 

External sources found mestizos are the main racial group in Colombia, making up between 49% and 58% of country's population.

According to Latinobarometro, 47% of Colombians surveyed self identified as mestizos.

Genetics
Genetic studies estimate that admixture of Colombians varies between 45.9% European, 33.8% Amerindian, and 20.3% African ancestry; and 62.5% European, 27.4% Amerindian, and 9.2% African ancestry.

In a genetic research published in 2014, 77% of Colombians sampled self identified as of mixed ancestry and their average admixture was 60% European, 29% Amerindian, and 11% African.

See also
 Mestizo
 Race and ethnicity in Colombia
 White Colombians
 Indigenous peoples in Colombia
 Afro-Colombians

References

Ethnic groups in Colombia
Mestizo